The O'Malley Case was the criminal prosecution of the Chief Magistrate of Philadelphia on charges of malfeasance, or serious misconduct in office by a public officer. The trials began in 1948 and continued into early 1949.

The defendant was John J O'Malley, Chief Magistrate of Philadelphia; the lead prosecutor was Laurence Howard Eldredge; the first assistant prosecutor was Robert Lowe Kunzig; The second assistant prosecutor was Henry W. Sawyer; the defense attorney was Lemuel Braddock Schofield.

References

1949 in case law
Law articles needing an infobox